Maya is a female name in various languages with various meanings. In Sanskrit, for instance, Māyā means "illusion or magic", and is also an alternate name of the Hindu goddess Lakshmi. In the Tupi language, of southern Brazil, it means "mother", while Mayara means "grandmother". In the Māori language, the name means "courage" or "bravery", and is popular for Māori girls in New Zealand. The name may be a variant form of the Greek theonym Maia (Μαῖα in Ancient Greek), the eldest of the Pleiades and the mother of Hermes in Greek and Roman mythology.

Variously spelled Maia or Maja it can also be used as a short form of Maria or Mary in Germany, the Scandinavian countries, and various East European and Balkan countries. Maya is also used as a short form for the name Amalia or the Basque name Amaia or Amaya (meaning "the end") in Spanish-speaking countries.

Popularity
All variants of the name are well-used in the English-speaking world and other countries. Maya has ranked among the one thousand most popular names for girls in the United States since 1970 and among the top one hundred most popular names for American girls since 2002. Spelling variant Maia has ranked among the top one thousand names for American girls since 1996.

Notable people named Maya
 Maya (High Priest of Amun), a High Priest of Amun until at least year four of Akhenaten
 Maya (Treasurer) (13th century BC), the treasurer to Pharaohs Tutankhamun, Ay, and Horemheb of Egypt
 Maya Ackerman, Russian-American computer scientist
 Maya Angelou (1928–2014), African-American author and poet
 Mathangi "Maya" Arulpragasam (born 1975), better known as M.I.A., British singer/rapper
 Maya Bar-Hillel (born 1943), Israeli psychologist
 Maya Kalle-Bentzur (born 1958), Israeli Olympic runner and long jumper
 Maya Berović (born 1987), Bosnian pop star
 Maya Bouskilla (born 1977), Israeli singer
 Maya Days, American singer
 Maya Deren (1917–1961), American avant-garde filmmaker
 Maya Diab (born 1980), Lebanese singer
 Maya Dolas (1966-1991), Indian gangster
 Maya Erskine (born 1987), American actress
 Maya Gabeira (born 1987), Brazilian surfer
 Maya Hawke (born 1998), American actress 
 Maya Higa (born 1998), a conservationist and Twitch streamer who streams under the name
 Maya Kazan (born 1986), American actress and director
 Maya Kulenovic (born 1975), Canadian artist
 Maya Lin (born 1959), American architect and sculptor, designer of the Vietnam Veterans Memorial
 Maya Millete (born 1981), American woman who went missing in 2021
 Maya Mishalska (born 1974), Mexican actress
 Maya Moore (born 1989), American basketball player
 Maya Nasri (born 1976), Lebanese singer
 Maya Okamoto (born 1967), Japanese voice actress
 Maya Plisetskaya (1925–2015), Soviet born ballet dancer
 Maya Ritter (born 1993), Canadian actress
 Maya Rudolph (born 1972), American actress and Saturday Night Live cast member
 Maya Sondhi (born 1983), British Indian actress
 Maya Simantov (born 1982), Israeli singer
 Maya Soetoro-Ng (born 1970), Indonesian-American half-sister of U.S. President Barack Obama
 Maya Stojan (born 1984), Swiss actress
 Maya Tahan (born 1999), Israeli tennis player
 Maya Tskitishvili (born 1974), Georgian economist and politician
 Maya Vik (born 1980), Norwegian singer
 Maya Wiley (born 1964), American civil rights activist and lawyer, 2021 mayoral candidate for New York City
 Maya Yoshida (born 1988), Japanese professional footballer
 Maya (singer) (born 1979), South Korean K-Pop singer
 Maya (musician) (born 1979), vocalist of Japanese visual kei band LM.C

Notable animals named Maya 
Maya (wolf), a cloned arctic wolf

Fictional characters named Maya 
 Maya (comics), an Indian DC Comics super-heroine
 Maya, Kai and Nya's Mother in Lego Ninjago. 
 Maya, the alter ego of the Marvel Comics superhero Paragon
 Maya, the original name given to Aelita in the French animated TV series Code Lyoko
 Maya (Azumanga Daioh), a minor character in the shōnen manga Azumanga Daioh
 Maya (Is the Order a Rabbit?), a character in the manga series Is the Order a Rabbit?
 Maya, one of the main characters in the Redakai: Conquer the Kairu franchise
 Maya, one of the main characters in Hiroki Endo's manga series Eden: It's an Endless World!
 Maya, fictional CIA intelligence analyst who tracked down Osama bin Laden from the film Zero Dark Thirty
 Maya Aida, protagonist of Glitter Force Doki Doki (originally named Mana Aida)
 Maya the Bee, the main character of the 1912 German children's book The Adventures of Maya the Bee and its various adaptions
 Fuuga no Maya, is a male who is half human and half angel in the animated series Saint Beast
 Maya Kennedy, minor character in Futari wa Pretty Cure (originally named Mayu Kashiwada)
 Maya Lopez, the Marvel Comics character known as Echo
 Maya Ibuki, a minor character in the Neon Genesis Evangelion franchise
 Maya Santos, a character from the children's animated series Maya & Miguel
 Maya St. Germain, a secondary character in the Pretty Little Liars series of young-adult novels
 Maya Tendo, one of the main characters from the Shojo Kageki Revue Starlight franchise
 Maya Yamato, drummer of the band Pastel＊Palettes from the BanG Dream! franchise

Live action TV 
 Maya Mehrotra/Maya Arjun Sharma, the lead character from the Sony Entertainment Television India drama series, Beyhadh
 Maya (Power Rangers), the Yellow Ranger in Power Rangers: Lost Galaxy
 Maya, an alien character on the television series Space: 1999
 Maya Bennett, a recurring character in the Disney Channel series The Suite Life on Deck
 Maya Chinn, a character from the American daytime soap opera Passions
 Maya Fisher, a character from the HBO TV show Six Feet Under
 Maya Gallo, a character in the NBC sitcom Just Shoot Me
 Maya Herrera, a character in the NBC drama series, Heroes
 Maya Wilkes, a character from the  American sitcom Girlfriends
 Maya the Magnificent, the title elephant of the 1966 film and 1967 TV series Maya
 Maya, a minor character in Battlestar Galactica
 Maya Avant, a character from The Bold and the Beautiful
 Maya Matlin, a character in the teen drama Degrassi: The Next Generation
 Maya Hart, a character in the Disney Channel show Girl Meets World
 Maya dela Rosa-Lim, a character in the drama series Be Careful with My Heart

Games 
 Maya, a character from video game Killer Instinct 2
 Maya Amano, a character from the Persona video games
 Maya Do'Urden, a sister of Drizzt Do'Urden in Forgotten Realms
 Maya Fey, a secondary character in the Ace Attorney franchise.
 Maya, one of the six playable characters in the video game Borderlands 2
 Maya Ocean, one of the four pre-made mermaids in The Sims 3: Island Paradise
 Maya Torres, one of the playable characters in State Of Decay
 Maya, one of the minor antagonists in Minecraft Story Mode

See also
Maia (name)
Maja (given name)
Mia (given name)
Mya (given name)

Notes

Feminine given names
Arabic feminine given names
English feminine given names
Indian feminine given names
Pakistani feminine given names
Spanish feminine given names